George II (Geórgios II; 19 July [O.S.: 7 July] 1890 – 1 April 1947) was King of Greece from September 1922 to March 1924 and from November 1935 to his death in April 1947.

The eldest son of King Constantine I and Sophia of Prussia, George followed his father into exile in 1917 following the National Schism, while his younger brother Alexander was installed as king. Constantine was restored to the throne in 1920 but was forced to abdicate two years later in the aftermath of the Greco-Turkish War. George acceded to the Greek throne, but after a failed royalist coup in October 1923 he was exiled to Romania. Greece was proclaimed a republic in March 1924 and George was formally deposed and stripped of Greek nationality. He remained in exile until the Greek monarchy was restored in 1935, upon which he resumed his royal duties. The king supported Ioannis Metaxas's 1936 self-coup, which established the authoritarian, nationalist and anti-communist 4th of August Regime.

Greece was overrun following a German invasion in April 1941, forcing George into his third exile. He left for Crete and then Egypt before settling in London, where he headed the Greek government-in-exile. George returned to Greece after the war after a 1946 plebiscite preserved the monarchy. He died of arteriosclerosis in April 1947 at the age of 56. Having no children, he was succeeded by his younger brother, Paul.

Early life and first period of kingship

George was born at the royal villa at Tatoi, near Athens, the eldest son of Crown Prince Constantine of Greece and his wife, Princess Sophia of Prussia; George pursued a military career, training with the Prussian Guard at the age of 18, then serving in the Balkan Wars as a member of the 1st Greek Infantry. When his grandfather was assassinated in 1913, his father became King Constantine I and George became the crown prince.

After a coup deposed Constantine I during World War I, Crown Prince George, by then a major in the Hellenic Army, followed his father into exile in June 1917 (see National Schism). George's younger brother, Alexander, was installed as king by Prime Minister Eleftherios Venizelos and the allied powers because George, like his father, was viewed as a germanophile.

When Alexander I died following an infection from a monkey bite in 1920, Venizelos was voted out of office, and a plebiscite restored Constantine to the throne. Crown Prince George served as a colonel, and later a major general in the war against Turkey. During this time he married his second cousin, on 27 February 1921 in Bucharest, Princess Elisabeth of Romania, daughter of King Ferdinand and Queen Marie of Romania. On 10 March that same year, his younger sister Princess Helen, married his brother in-law from his recent marriage the future Carol II of Romania. When the Turks defeated Greece at the Battle of Dumlupınar, the military forced the abdication of Constantine, and George succeeded to the Greek throne on 27 September 1922.

Following a failed royalist coup in October 1923, the Revolutionary Committee asked George to leave Greece while the National Assembly considered the question of the future form of government. He complied and, although he refused to abdicate, George departed on 19 December 1923 for exile in his wife's home nation of Romania.

A cold, aloof man, George rarely inspired love or affection from those who knew him, and certainly not from the vast majority of his subjects. Many commented that his moody, sullen personality seemed more appropriate for his ancestral homeland of Denmark than Greece. Furthermore, George's long years spent living abroad had led him to a mentality that was essentially Western European in outlook. He had come to see Greece very much as Western Europeans did at the time, namely as a primitive, backward Balkan state inhabited by people who were romantic, but savage.

First exile

In Romania 
The Second Hellenic Republic was proclaimed by parliament on 25 March 1924, before being confirmed by a referendum two and a half weeks later. George and Elisabeth were officially deposed and banished; along with all members of the royal family they were stripped of their Greek citizenship and their property was confiscated by the government of the new republic. Rendered stateless, they were issued new passports from their cousin, King Christian X of Denmark.

Exiled in Romania since December 1923, the former Greek ruler and his wife settled in Bucharest, where King Ferdinand and Queen Marie of Romania put at their disposal a wing of the Cotroceni palace for some time. After several weeks, however, the couple moved and established their residence in a more modest villa on Victory Avenue. Regular guests of the Romanian sovereigns, George and Elizabeth took part in the ceremonies which punctuated the life of the Hohenzollern-Sigmaringen family. Despite the kindness with which his mother-in-law treated him, the ex-King of the Hellenes felt idle in Bucharest and struggled to hide the boredom he felt from the splendors of the Romanian court.

Tried by the humiliations of exile, financial difficulties and the absence of descendants, relations between George and Elisabeth deteriorated. After having first assuaged her weariness in too rich food and gambling, the ex-queen of the Hellenes then carried on extra-marital affairs with various married men. She took advantage of a visit to her sick sister, in Belgrade, to flirt with her own brother-in-law, Alexander, the King of Yugoslavia. Later, she began an affair with her husband's banker, a Greek named Alexandros Scavani, whom she made her chamberlain to cover up the scandal.

In the United Kingdom 

At the start of his life as an exile, George spent half the year in Romania with Elizabeth. Alone or with his wife, he divided the remaining six months between Tuscany, where he resided with his mother, at Villa Bobolina, and the UK, where he had many friends. On 16 September 1930, he was initiated into Freemasonry in London and became venerable master of the Wellwood Lodge in 1933. After the death of the queen dowager Sophie, in 1932, George chose to leave Bucharest and his wife permanently to establish his residence in London. Accompanied by his squire, Major Dimitrios Levidis, and a faithful servant, Mitso Panteleos, the ex-sovereign rented a small suite with two rooms at Brown's Hotel in Mayfair.

Restoration of monarchy and the Metaxas regime

After the abolition of the monarchy, in 1924, the anti-Venizelist leaders, except for Metaxas, refused to recognise the new regime. This "regime issue", that arose just after the proclamation of the Republic, haunted Greek politics for more than a decade and eventually led to the restoration of monarchy. In October 1935 General Georgios Kondylis, a former Venizelist who had suddenly decided to throw in his lot with the monarchist forces, overthrew the government and appointed himself prime minister. He then arranged a plebiscite both to approve his government and to bring an end to the republic. On 3 November 1935, almost 98% of the reported votes supported restoration of the monarchy. The balloting was not secret, and participation was compulsory. As Time described it at the time, "As a voter one could drop into the ballot box a blue vote for George II and please General George Kondylis ... or one could cast a red ballot for the Republic and get roughed up."

George, who had been living at Brown's Hotel in London, returned to Greek soil on 25 November. Almost immediately he and Kondylis disagreed over the terms of a general amnesty the King wanted to declare, and George appointed an interim prime minister, Konstantinos Demertzis. New elections were held in January, which resulted in a hung parliament with the Communists (who were naturally anti-monarchist) holding the balance of power. A series of unexpected deaths amongst the better-known politicians (including Kondylis and Demertzis), as well as the uncertain political situation, led to the rise to power of politician and veteran army officer Ioannis Metaxas. On 4 August 1936, George endorsed Metaxas's establishment of dictatorship – the "4th of August Regime", signing decrees that dissolved the parliament, banned political parties, abolished the constitution, and purported to create a "Third Hellenic Civilization". The king, ruling jointly with Prime Minister Metaxas, oversaw a right-wing regime in which political opponents were arrested and strict censorship was imposed. George disliked dealing with both Greek politicians and ordinary Greeks, and preferred to let Metaxas undertake tours of the provinces. King George retained the full control of the army and he was largely responsible  for foreign policy making.

World War II

Italian and German invasions
On 28 October 1940, Metaxas rejected an Italian ultimatum demanding the stationing of Italian troops on Greek soil, sparking the Greco-Italian War. The Greeks successfully repelled the Italian invasion and launched a successful counter-attack, eventually occupying the southern half of Albania (then an Italian protectorate). But when the Germans invaded from Bulgaria on 6 April 1941, the Greeks and the British Expeditionary Force were quickly overrun.

Crisis of April 1941 and evacuation to Crete

Following the suicide of Prime Minister Alexandros Koryzis on 18 April 1941 in the face of the rapid German advance, George unable to find a speedy successor, found himself as the de facto head of government as well as head of the armed services. The King had thus a unique opportunity to form a broader government of national consensus, and abolish the hated dictatorial regime—whose sole bastion of support he now was. Though urged to this step by the influential British ambassador, Michael Palairet, George refused.

Instead, several names were put forward to head a government. George initially proposed Konstantinos Kotzias, one of Metaxas' ministers, but his ties to the regime made him an unfeasible choice; instead veteran Venizelist general Alexandros Mazarakis-Ainian was given the mandate to form a government, but returned it on 20 April, partly due to his refusal to collaborate with Metaxas' hated Security Minister Konstantinos Maniadakis; other figures, such as the former dictator Theodoros Pangalos, were also rejected. Finally, Emmanouil Tsouderos, former governor of the Bank of Greece, was chosen, chiefly on account of his known Anglophile sentiments, Venizelist past, and Cretan origin-where with mainland Greece being overrun, the government was preparing to evacuate too. As Cretans cherished the memory of Venizelos but was generally seen as anti-monarchical, this appointment was seen as a sop to local sentiment.

On 23 April the King and the government fled the Greek mainland for Crete. Despite a heroic defense of the island by Greek and New Zealand forces alongside the local population in the face of a German airborne attack, Crete soon fell and George was forced evacuated once again-initially to Egypt. Seemingly at the behest of King Farouk of Egypt and his pro-Italian ministers, George soon relocated to Great Britain, as in his previous exile.

Second exile

Throughout the Axis occupation, George remained the internationally recognised head of state, backed by the Greek government-in-exile and the Free Greek Forces. However, the British Foreign Office found George exceedingly difficult to deal with. He was deeply obstinate about upholding what he regarded as his royal prerogatives; he proved notably unwilling to compromise with those who wanted a clear break with the 4th of August Regime. He also resisted British pressure to promise to restore the constitution of 1911, under the grounds that doing so would be to admit he acted illegally in suspending parts of the constitution in 1936. As late as 1942, George kept on cabinet ministers from the Metaxas regime, most notably Maniadakis. Under heavy British pressure, George in a radio broadcast on 28 October 1941 reluctantly proclaimed the end of the 4th of August Regime, and only in February 1942 did he promise to restore articles 5, 6, 10, 12, 14, 20 and 95 of the 1911 constitution.

A deeply paranoid and insecure man, George believed that the British government was plotting to prevent his return to Greece, despite all of the evidence to the contrary. Edward Warner of the Southern Department of the Foreign Office wrote in March 1942 that the king was "under the extraordinary impression that the Foreign Office was 'pro-Republican and anti-himself'". The British ambassador to the government-in-exile, Sir Reginald Leeper, noted that the king's coldness did not win him many friends, writing: "Amongst these vivacious, talkative and intensely political southerners he is very much the reserved northerner who damps the ardour of those who might otherwise acclaim him". Leeper noted that almost every meeting he had with the king, he had to listen to a lengthy litany of complaints. In particular, the king objected to BBC's Greek language service, whose main radio announcer, G.N. Soteriadis, was a Venizelist. George repeatedly asked that Soteriadis be replaced with a monarchist. One of George's few friends was the British Prime Minister Winston Churchill, who was determined to see him restored and often backed the king's complaints against his own officials.

In occupied Greece, however, the leftist partisans of the National Liberation Front (EAM) and National Popular Liberation Army (ELAS), now unfettered by Metaxas' oppression, had become the largest Greek Resistance movement, enjoying considerable popular support. As liberation drew nearer, however, the prospect of the King's return caused dissensions both inside Greece and among the Greeks abroad. Although the King effectively renounced the Metaxas regime in a radio broadcast, a large section of the people and many politicians rejected his return on account of his support of the dictatorship. In November 1943, George wrote to the prime minister-in-exile Emmanouil Tsouderos, "I shall examine anew the question of the date of my return to Greece in agreement with the Government". Either deliberately or accidentally, the version released for publication omitted the words "of the date", creating the impression that George had agreed to a further plebiscite on the monarchy, even though a retraction was issued.

After two changes of prime minister, the establishment of a rival Communist-led government in occupied Greece and a pro-EAM mutiny among the armed forces in the Middle East, it was agreed in the May 1944 Lebanon conference that the fate of the monarchy would be decided in a national referendum. George was very much opposed to a regency, and tried his best to turn his friend Winston Churchill against Archbishop Damaskinos of Athens, accusing him of being a Communist and a Nazi collaborator. As late as Christmas Eve 1944, during the height of the Dekemvriana, George had rejected the compromise solution of a regency, demanding that he return to Greece at once to reclaim his throne. On 29 December 1944, at a meeting at 10 Downing Street, Churchill told the king "that if he did not agree to the matter would be settled without him, and that we should recognise the new Government instead of him". The king's private secretary recalled: "I could hear through the door the voices of Churchill and Eden, particularly the latter, raised in anger at the King. In this heated argument the door was flung open and the King stormed out, his face white and taut ... In the car as we drove back to the hotel the King would not trust himself to speak; after recovering his composure he went back to Downing Street and informed Churchill and Eden that had no choice but to acquiesce to their demands".

Bowing to Allied pressure, George was forced to appoint Archbishop Damaskinos of Athens as Regent in January 1945. Damaskinos immediately appointed a republican-dominated government. Ill, exhausted and powerless, George bought a lease on a house in Chester Square, Belgravia, and made a home there with his long-time mistress.

Return to Greece and death

In elections held on 31 March 1946, the monarchist parties won a clear majority of the parliamentary seats, aided by the abstention of the Communists, and the referendum on the monarchy was set for 1 September. Between then and the plebiscite, the electoral registers were revised under Allied supervision. The announced results claimed 68.4% in favour of the King's return on an 86.6% turnout. However, even Allied observers acknowledged that the official results were marked by significant fraud by monarchist supporters. In the words of the official Allied observation report, "There is no doubt in our minds that the party representing the government view exercised undue influence in securing votes in support of the return of the King."

On 26 September, George returned to Greece to find the Royal Palace looted, the woods at Tatoi chopped down for fuel, and corpses buried in shallow graves outside. His country faced economic collapse and political instability.

He died of arteriosclerosis on 1 April 1947, after he was discovered unconscious in his room at the Royal Palace in Athens. When the news was announced some thought it to be an April Fool's Day joke.

His funeral was held on 6 April at the Orthodox Metropolitan Cathedral of Athens, He was succeeded by his younger brother, Paul.

In popular culture 

During WWII, the Allies used the figure of George II as an instrument of propaganda to reinforce Greek patriotic sentiment. Several short films centred on the sovereign and his government are thus shot, such as Heroic Greece! by the American Frank Norton (1941).

The romantic relationship of King George II and his mistress, nicknamed "Mrs. Brown", is briefly mentioned in the third episode ("The New King") of the British mini-series Edward & Mrs. Simpson, which features the king's cruise with Edward VIII and Wallis Simpson in the Greek Islands, in 1936.

Various stamps bearing the effigy of George II have been issued by Greek Post during his reign. A series of four stamps depicting the sovereign was thus issued, shortly after his restoration to the throne, on 1 November 1937, with face values of ₯1, ₯3, ₯8 and ₯100.

Various Greek coins bearing the image of George II have been issued by the Bank of Greece. Among these are:
 a series of commemorative coins minted in 1940 to celebrate the fifth anniversary of the king's restoration (₯20 and ₯100 coins struck in copper, silver and gold bearing the date of 25 November 1935);
 a ₯30 silver coin put into circulation in 1963 on the occasion of the centenary of the Greek monarchy and showing the portraits of kings George I, Constantine I, Alexander I and George II and Paul I.

Honours
  Kingdom of Greece:
 Founder of the Order of St. George and St. Constantine, January 1936
 Founder of the Order of Saints Olga and Sophia, January 1936
 Commander's cross of the Cross of Valour, 28 October 1946
 :
 Knight of the Elephant, with Collar, 15 August 1909
 Cross of Honour of the Order of the Dannebrog, 15 August 1909
 : Grand Cross of the Legion of Honour, 10 December 1892
  House of Savoy: Knight of the Annunciation, with Collar and Star
  : Grand Cross of the Order of Saint-Charles, 11 April 1940
 : Knight of the White Eagle
 : War Cross Medal
 : Collar of the Order of Carol I
 : Knight of the Seraphim, 20 May 1919
 :
 Honorary Grand Cross of the Royal Victorian Order, 20 July 1909
 Stranger Knight of the Garter, 7 November 1938
 Bailiff Grand Cross of St. John
 Companion of the Distinguished Service Order

Ancestry

References

Sources
Φύλλας Μιχάλης, «H επίσκεψη του Βασιλέως Γεωργίου β΄ στη Σάμο το 1937 μέσα από τον σαμιακό τύπο της εποχής: η περίπτωση των εφημερίδων Σάμος και Αιγαίον», Δελτίον Σαμιακών Σπουδών, τομ. 5 (2019–2020), σελ. 113–26

External links
 

1890 births
1947 deaths
19th-century Greek people
20th-century Greek monarchs
20th-century prime ministers of Greece
Nobility from Athens
Greek princes
Danish princes
Field marshals of Greece
House of Glücksburg (Greece)
Extra Knights Companion of the Garter
World War II political leaders
Greek people of World War II
Bailiffs Grand Cross of the Order of St John
Eastern Orthodox monarchs
Burials at Tatoi Palace Royal Cemetery
Honorary Knights Grand Cross of the Royal Victorian Order
Order of Saints George and Constantine
Companions of the Distinguished Service Order
Recipients of the War Cross (Norway)
Knights Grand Cross of the Order of Saints Maurice and Lazarus
Greek exiles
Kings of Greece
Commander's Crosses of the Cross of Valour (Greece)
4th of August Regime
Greek anti-communists
Sons of kings
Deaths from arteriosclerosis
Recipients of the Cross of Honour of the Order of the Dannebrog
Recipients of the Order of the White Eagle (Poland)